Little Hell is an unincorporated community in Accomack County, Virginia.  The site was named after a 19th-century tavern.  A 1996 newspaper story reported that the neighborhood around the tavern had recently consisted of three buildings, but that only one remained by the time the story was written.  A residential development named Evergreen was expected to grow up in the area.

References

Unincorporated communities in Virginia
Unincorporated communities in Accomack County, Virginia